Anisoptera  may refer to:
 Anisoptera, an insect suborder containing dragonflies
 Anisoptera (Conocephalus), a subgenus of bush cricket in the subfamily Conocephalinae
 Anisoptera (plant), a genus of plants in the family Dipterocarpaceae